Austin "Jack" DeCoster is an American egg farmer and business executive. He founded Wright County Egg as a teenager.

DeCoster was raised in Turner, Maine. He began farming at the age of 12, starting with 250 chickens. He is a born again Baptist. He founded Quality Egg  in Turner in 1961.

On August 30, 1979, DeCoster sold DeCoster Egg Farms, Inc. to Acton Food Services Corporation for $17.2 million. He maintained a role with Main Egg Producers, a spinoff company, and devoted his fulltime attention to a new operation in Maryland. He rebought DeCoster Egg Farms in the on May 22, 1985, in an auction.

DeCoster has a history of violations relating to labor, environmental, and public health offenses.

References

Citations

Bibliography 

Living people
Year of birth missing (living people)
Place of birth missing (living people)
Farmers from Maine
People from Turner, Maine
Businesspeople from Maine
21st-century American businesspeople
20th-century American businesspeople
American company founders
Animal rights movement